Khurma is a Bhojpuriya milk sweet popular in Bihar and Purvanchal. It originated in the Udwantnagar region of Arrah in Bihar.

References

Indian desserts